Paul Jordan (November 24, 1916, Krakow, Austria-Hungary – November 7, 2006) was an American Lyrical expressionist painter, journalist and memoirist. His birth name and the cause of death are not currently known.

He lived in Lviv until the start of World War II when he migrated to England where he attended the London School of Economics (LSE) and St Martin's School of Art. He covered the war for the Associated Press and UPI.

His paintings were displayed at galleries in London, Paris and Carnegie Hall. He opposed Abstract Expressionism and "pop art". His wife, Christine Neubert, was a choreographer at the Children's Ballet Theater in NYC. She survives him.

At the time of his death, several weeks before his 90th birthday, he was writing a "memoir evoking three different worlds: semi-feudal Poland to semi socialist Britain and semi-"Anything Goes USA" (as per The New York Times obituary, December 6, 2006).

External links
Paul Jordan's website

1916 births
2006 deaths
American artists
American male journalists
Artists from Lviv
Polish emigrants to the United States
Alumni of the London School of Economics
Journalists from New York City
Polish expatriates in the United Kingdom